Acousmaticus magnicornis is a moth in the family Cossidae, and the only species in the genus Acousmaticus. It is found in Chile.

References

Natural History Museum Lepidoptera generic names catalog

Hypoptinae
Endemic fauna of Chile